The olive spinetail (Cranioleuca obsoleta) is a species of bird in the family Furnariidae. It is found in northeastern Argentina, southern Brazil, and eastern Paraguay. Its natural habitats are temperate forests and subtropical or tropical moist lowland forests. It is known to hybridize with Cranioleuca pyrrhophia in Southern Rio Grande do Sul, Brazil.

References

olive spinetail
Birds of Paraguay
Birds of the Selva Misionera
Birds of the South Region
olive spinetail
Taxonomy articles created by Polbot
Taxa named by Ludwig Reichenbach